The 1929–30 Swiss International Ice Hockey Championship was the 15th edition of the international ice hockey championship in Switzerland. HC Davos won the championship by defeating HC Rosey Gstaad in the final.

First round

Eastern Series

Semifinal 
 Akademischer EHC Zürich - Lyceum Zuoz 2:1

Final 
HC Davos - Akademischer EHC Zürich 14:1

HC Davos qualified for the final.

Western Series

Semifinals 
 HC Rosey Gstaad - Lycée Jaccard 8:1
 HC Château-d’Œx - Star Lausanne 2:0

Final 
HC Rosey Gstaad - HC Château-d’Œx 1:0

HC Rosey Gstaad qualified for the final.

Final 
 HC Rosey Gstaad - HC Davos 1:4

External links 
Swiss Ice Hockey Federation – All-time results

Inter
Swiss International Ice Hockey Championship seasons